HD 164595 b is a confirmed exoplanet orbiting around a Sun-like star HD 164595 every 40 days some 94.36 light-years away. It was detected with the radial velocity technique with the SOPHIE echelle spectrograph. The planet has a minimal mass equivalent of 16 Earths.

It is believed to be a Neptune-like gassy planet incapable of supporting life. The planet has a minimal mass of 16 Earth masses.

Possible radio signal from star system 

A recent (2016) radio signal at 11 GHz (2.7 cm wavelength) has been observed from the HD 164595 stellar system. It is unknown which planet of that stellar system is involved, if any. It could instead be gravitational lensing from a more distant source. SETI investigators are looking into it, but the chances of the signal being from an extraterrestrial civilization are considered slim, at best," with SETI researcher Eric Korpela calling it "uninteresting".

References

Giant planets
Exoplanets discovered in 2015
Exoplanets detected by radial velocity
Hot Neptunes
Hercules (constellation)